Six Deuce is a global sporting goods and fitness apparel company.  Founded in 2005, the company is based in Ames, Iowa and Helsingborg, Sweden (European Division).

The company logo is a "6" and a "2" intertwined and outlined.
Originally, the company focused solely on combat sports apparel & equipment. The design themes were mostly martial arts based: Muay Thai, Combat Sambo, Boxing, and Mixed Martial Arts.  Although primarily a clothing company, Six Deuce also previously sold boxing gloves, fight shorts, and other combat sports equipment.

In 2013, most of the MMA & combat sports apparel was phased out.  Currently Six Deuce concentrates on fitness clothing, specifically women's leggings.  Other offerings include unisex fitness leggings, sweatshirts, T-shirts and tops.

References 

 FightTrends.com Interview with Six Deuce Clothing 2009. Retrieved 2012-11-06.
 The Grappler's Closet - Six Deuce Gear • Open Mat Radio 2012. Retrieved 2012-11-06.

External links 
 Six Deuce Official Web Site
 Six Deuce European Web Site
 Six Deuce Pakistan Web Site

Clothing companies of the United States
Clothing brands